Vertical Smiles is the seventh studio album by Southern rock band Blackfoot.

It is the second and last album to feature former Uriah Heep keyboardist Ken Hensley and the first without guitarist Charlie Hargrett who left during the recording of the album over disagreements with the rest of the band and management.

Track listing
Side one
 "Morning Dew" (Bonnie Dobson cover) - 5:27
 "Living in the Limelight" (Peter Cetera cover) - 4:02
 "Ride with You" - 3:33
 "Get It On" - 4:29

Side two
 "Young Girl" - 4:24
 "Summer Days" - 3:19
 "A Legend Never Dies" (RPM cover) - 3:03
 "Heartbeat and Heels" - 3:15
 "In for the Kill" - 3:50

Personnel
 Rickey Medlocke - lead and rhythm guitars, lead and backing vocals, guitar synthesizer
 Ken Hensley - keyboards, backing vocals
 Greg T. Walker - bass, backing vocals
 Jakson Spires - drums, backing vocals, percussion
 Sherri Jarrel - backing vocals

Production
 Engineered by Eddy Offord at Eddy Offord Studios, Atlanta, Georgia
 Mixed by Eddy Offord and Rick Medlocke
Mastered at Atlantic Studios by Dennis King
Front cover photography: Gary Heery, Bob Defrin
Art Direction: Bob Defrin
Produced by Al Nalli and Eddy Offord for Al Nalli Productions, INC.

References

1975 albums
Blackfoot (band) albums
Albums produced by Eddy Offord